Randall Dodd is the founder and director for Financial Policy Forum in Washington, DC, United States, a non-profit organization that deals with regulation of financial markets.

He received a Ph.D. in Economics from the Columbia University, where he specialized in international trade and finance. He has taught at both Columbia and Johns Hopkins Universities. He was also legislative director for congressman Joe Kennedy.

References

External links
Financial Policy Forum

Collection of works by Randall Dodd

American economists
Columbia Graduate School of Arts and Sciences alumni
Living people
Year of birth missing (living people)